The Sound of Spring is an album of compositions related to springtime by the Ramsey Lewis Trio, recorded in 1962 and released on the Argo label.

Track listing
All compositions by Ramsey Lewis except as indicated
 "Sound of Spring" - 2:30   
 "Spring Can Really Hang You Up the Most" (Fran Landesman, Tommy Wolf) - 4:25   
 "Blue Spring" - 3:00   
 "Spring Is Here" (Lorenz Hart, Richard Rodgers) - 4:22   
 "Spring Will Be a Little Late This Year" (Frank Loesser) - 2:43   
 "Spring Fever" - 2:35   
 "It Might As Well Be Spring" (Oscar Hammerstein II, Rogers) - 3:52   
 "Soft Winds"  (Benny Goodman, Fletcher Henderson) - 3:10   
 "There'll Be Another Spring" (Peggy Lee, Hubie Wheeler) - 2:30   
 "Truly, Truly Spring" (Eldee Young) - 3:27

Personnel 
Ramsey Lewis - piano
El Dee Young - bass
Issac "Red" Holt - drums
String section arranged and conducted by Riley Hampton (tracks 1-5)

References 

1962 albums
Ramsey Lewis albums
Argo Records albums
Albums produced by Leonard Chess